Neoastelia  is a genus of plants in the family Asteliaceae containing the single species Neoastelia spectabilis, commonly known as the silver sword lily, that is endemic to a small area on the Northern Tablelands of New South Wales. It is a species of herb with long, linear leaves and large groups of whitish flowers, followed by spherical, pale green berries.

Description

Taxonomy
Neoastelia spectabilis was first formally described in 1987 by J.B. Williams in Flora of Australia from specimens he collected in 1978.

Distribution and habitat

Conservation status
This species is listed as "vulnerable" under the Australian Government Environment Protection and Biodiversity Conservation Act 1999 and the New South Wales Government Biodiversity Conservation Act 2016. The main threats to the species include trampling by walkers, illegal collection and its small population size. It is only known from four populations in the New England National Park.

References

Asteliaceae
Monotypic Asparagales genera
Flora of New South Wales
Taxa named by John Beaumont Williams
Plants described in 1987